Taopi is a city in Lodi Township, Mower County, Minnesota, United States. The population was 58 at the 2010 census. It is located near the source of the Wapsipinicon River.

Geography

Demographics

2010 census
As of the census of 2010, there were 58 people, 24 households, and 18 families living in the city. The racial makeup of the city was 100.0% White.

There were 24 households, of which 33.3% had children under the age of 18 living with them, 62.5% were married couples living together, 12.5% had a female householder with no husband present, and 25.0% were non-families. 25.0% of all households were made up of individuals, and 8.3% had someone living alone who was 65 years of age or older. The average household size was 2.42 and the average family size was 2.83.

The median age in the city was 38.5 years. 25.9% of residents were under the age of 18; 10.2% were between the ages of 18 and 24; 20.6% were from 25 to 44; 27.6% were from 45 to 64; and 15.5% were 65 years of age or older. The gender makeup of the city was 50.0% male and 50.0% female.

2000 census
As of the census of 2000, there were 93 people, 33 households, and 26 families living in the city. The racial makeup of the city was 100.00% White.

There were 33 households, out of which 42.4% had children under the age of 18 living with them, 63.6% were married couples living together, 15.2% had a female householder with no husband present, and 18.2% were non-families. 15.2% of all households were made up of individuals, and 12.1% had someone living alone who was 65 years of age or older. The average household size was 2.82 and the average family size was 3.15.

In the city, the population was spread out, with 31.2% under the age of 18, 7.5% from 18 to 24, 31.2% from 25 to 44, 15.1% from 45 to 64, and 15.1% who were 65 years of age or older. The median age was 35 years. For every 100 females, there were 111.4 males. For every 100 females age 18 and over, there were 100.0 males.

The median income for a household in the city was $33,750, and the median income for a family was $30,000. Males had a median income of $28,125 versus $26,250 for females. The per capita income for the city was $11,250. There were 10.0% of families and 4.8% of the population living below the poverty line, including no under eighteens and none of those over 64.

History
The name of the village is derived from "Taopi," the Indian chief who befriended the settlers after the New Ulm massacre. It was platted in 1875 by the Taopi Farming Company in the name of John W. Wood. The first lot was bought by James Olberg and J. Martz opened a furniture store there before moving the operation to Le Roy. Taopi had the largest steam flour mill in southern Minnesota and it could process 300,000 bushels of wheat each year.

The village suffered significant damage from an EF2 tornado on April 12, 2022, part of the April 2022 North American storm complex. Two noncritical injuries were reported.

References

Further reading

Cities in Mower County, Minnesota
Cities in Minnesota